Mfuwe is the main settlement of South Luangwa National Park in the Eastern Province of Zambia, serving the tourism industry and wildlife conservation in the Luangwa Valley.

Mfuwe has an airport with a  surfaced runway capable of taking regional international flights.

This village holds the record of the highest temperature ever recorded in Zambia with  set on 26 October 2011.

See also

Mfuwe Airport
South Luangwa National Park
Luangwa River

Populated places in Eastern Province, Zambia